The following is a list of notable people from A to E (last name) who were at some point a follower of the ideology of Nazism or affiliated with the Nazi Party. This is not meant to be a list of every person who was ever a member of the Nazi Party, some entries can be found elsewhere on the encyclopedia.

List criteria
This list only covers notable figures who were active within the party, did something significant within it that is of historical note, and/or were members of the Nazi Party according to multiple reliable publications. The following entries however are excluded here as they can be found on their own respective lists:

Doctors - notable "Nazi doctors" are covered at: List of Nazi doctors
SS personnel - notable people within the ranks are covered at: List of SS personnel (Nazis by default)

For a list of the main leaders and most important party figures see: List of Nazi Party leaders and officials.

Overview A–E F–K L–R S–Z

A
{| class="wikitable sortable"
|-
! Name
! Birth
! Death
! Occupation
! Nationality
! class="unsortable"| Reference(s)
|-
| Albert Abicht
| 
| 
| Politician
| align="center| Germany
| 
|-
| Hermann Josef Abs
| 
| 
| Banker
| align="center| Germany
| 
|-
| Karl Ferdinand Abt
| 
| 
| Politician
| align="center| Nazi Germany
| 
|-
| Ernst Achenbach
| 
| 
| Diplomat 
| align="center| Germany
| 
|-
| Eberhard Achterberg
| 
| 
| Propagandist
| align="center| Germany
| 
|-
| Josef Ackermann
| 
| 
| Politician
| align="center| Germany
| 
|-
| Karl Adam (rowing coach)
| 
| 
| Rowing coach
| align="center| Germany
| 
|-
| Karl Adam (theologian)
| 
| 
| Theologian
| align="center| Germany
| 
|-
| Wilhelm Adam
| 
| 
| Wehrmacht officer
| align="center| Germany
| 
|-
| Ernst Ahl
| 
| 
| Wehrmacht officer
| align="center| Nazi Germany
| 
|-
| Wolf Albach-Retty
| 
| 
| Actor
| align="center| Austria
| 
|-
| Karl Albiker
| 
| 
| Artist
| align="center| Germany
| 
|-
| Herbert Albrecht
| 
| 
| Agricultural Specialist
| align="center| Nazi Germany
| 
|-
| Felix Allfarth
| 
| 
| Merchant
| align="center| Nazi Germany
| 
|-
| Günther Altenburg
| 
| 
| Diplomat
| align="center| Germany
| 
|-
| Wolfgang Aly
| 
| 
| Classical philologist
| align="center| Germany
| 
|-
| Otto Ambros
| 
| 
| Chemist
| align="center| Germany
| 
|-
| Heinrich Anacker
| 
| 
| Author
| align="center| Switzerland
| 
|-
| Charlotte Ander
| 
| 
| Actress
| align="center| Germany
| 
|-
| Sepp Angerer
| 
| 
| Art dealer
| align="center| Nazi Germany
| 
|-
| Joachim Angermeyer
| 
| 
| Politician
| align="center| Germany
| 
|-
| Ernst Anrich
| 
| 
| Professor
| align="center| Germany
| 
|-
| Friedrich Asinger
| 
| 
| Chemist
| align="center| Austria
| 
|-
| Karl Astel
| 
| 
| Rector
| align="center| Nazi Germany
| 
|-
| Prince August Wilhelm of Prussia
| 
| 
| Royalty
| align="center| Germany
| 
|-
| Hans Walter Aust
| 
| 
| Journalist
| align="center| Germany
| <ref>Ehemalige Nationalsozialisten in Pankows Diensten, S. 6</ref>
|-
| Artur Axmann
| 
| 
| Reichsjugendführer
| align="center| Germany
| 
|-
| Georg Ay
| 
| 
| Politician
| align="center| Germany
| 
|-
| Albert Bach
| 
| 
| Generalmajor
| align="center| Austria
| 
|-
| Georg Bachmann
| 
| 
| Politician
| align="center| Germany
| 
|-
| Alfred Baeumler
| 
| 
| Philosopher
| align="center| Germany
| 
|-
| Rudolf Bamler
| 
| 
| Generalmajor
| align="center| Germany
| 
|-
| Ewald Banse
| 
| 
| Geographer
| align="center| Germany
| 
|}

B

Ludwig Friedrich Barthel
Friedrich Franz Bauer
Hans BaumannHans Baumann: Gold und Götter von Peru 1961 JUGENDBUCH
Eleonore Baur
Walter Becher
Helene Bechstein
Peter Emil Becker
Heinrich Behmann
Josefa Berens-Totenohl
Claus Bergen
Ernst Bergmann (philosopher)
Hugo Bernatzik
German Bestelmeyer
Friedrich Bethge
Wilhelm Beyer
Heinrich Beythien
Ludwig Bieberbach
Hans Biebow
Dorothea Binz
Horst BirrKay Weniger: Das große Personenlexikon des Films. Band 1, Berlin 2001, p. 400
Otto Christian Archibald von Bismarck
Friedrich Wilhelm von Bissing
Walter Bitterlich
Herbert Blankenhorn
Hanns Blaschke
Wilhelm Blaschke
Anneliese Bläsing
Johannes Blaskowitz
Leopold Blauensteiner
Kurt Blecha
Karl Blessing
Karl Blessinger
Willi Bloedorn
Werner von Blomberg
Heinrich Blume
Walter Blume
Rudolf Bockelmann
Peter Boenisch
Herbert Böhme
Andreas Bolek
Ernst Bollmann
Otto Friedrich Bollnow
Friedrich Bolte
Helmut de Boor
Carl Friedrich Wilhelm Borgward
Taras Borodajkewycz
Hugo Ferdinand Boss
Maximilian Böttcher
Johanna Braach
Fritz Bracht
Therese Brandl
Heinz Brandt
Peter Paul BrauerJanine Diedrich, Heinz Rühmann: Karrierist und Opportunist oder Gegner des Nationalsozialismus, GRIN Verlag, 2007, p. 14
Otto Bräutigam
Arno Breker
Hans Karl Breslauer
Martin Broszat
Hugo Bruckmann
Helmuth Brückner
Walter Brugmann
Otto Brunner
Ewald Bucher
Karl von Buchka
Erwin Bumke
Hans Bunge
Wilhelm Amsinck Burchard-Motz
Adolf Butenandt
Rudolf Buttmann

C

Christopher Leblanc
Paul Carell
Hans Carste
Karl Carstens
Peter Carstens
Werner Catel
Karl Chmielewski
Walter Christaller
Friedrich Christiansen
Heinrich Class
Carl Clauberg
Hans Clemens
Volker von Collande
Klaus Conrad
Leonardo Conti
Werner Conze
Rudolf Creutz
Max de Crinis

D

Kurt Daluege
Ernst Damzog
Theodor Dannecker
Konrad Dannenberg
Luise Danz
Fritz Darges
Richard Walther Darré
Adolf Dassler
Fritz Dassler
Rudolf Dassler
Wilhelm Decker
Peter Deeg
Karl Deichgräber
Ewald von Demandowsky
Karl Maria Demelhuber
Gerhard Dengler
Oskar-Hubert Dennhardt
Heinrich Deubel
Otto Dickel
Karl Diebitsch
Hans-Heinrich Dieckhoff
Rudolf Diels
Oskar Dienstbach
Eduard Dietl
Josef Dietrich
Otto Dietrich
Hans Diller
Erwin Ding-Schuler
Erich Dinges
Hugo Dingler
Artur Dinter
Herbert von Dirksen
Oskar Dirlewanger
Hugo Distler
Paul Dittel
Heimito von Doderer
Eugen Dollmann
Willi Domgraf-Fassbaender
Karl Dönitz
Richard Donnevert
Alexander von Dörnberg
Claude Dornier
Julius Dorpmüller
Hans Dorr
Franz Xaver Dorsch
Richard Drauz
Otto-Heinrich Drechsler
Wilhelm Dreher
Margot Dreschel
Anton Drexler
Georg Ferdinand Duckwitz
Anton Dunckern
Karlfried Graf Dürckheim

E

Irmfried Eberl
Karl von Eberstein
Dietrich Eckart
Joachim Albrecht Eggeling
Hans Ehlich
Horst EhmkeDer Spiegel, 16 July 2007, Hoffnungslos dazwischen
Carl Ehrenberg
Arthur Ehrhardt
Erich Ehrlinger
Adolf Eichmann
Theodor Eicke
August Eigruber
Hans Eisele (physician)
Walter Eisfeld
Paul Freiherr von Eltz-Rübenach
Otmar Emminger
Hans Endres
Carl Ludvig Engel
Franz Ritter von Epp
Hans Eppinger
Erhard Eppler
Josef Erber
Eduard Erdmann
Otto von Erdmannsdorff
Ernst II, Duke of Saxe-Altenburg
Hans-Dietrich Ernst
Karl Ernst
 Karl Escherich
Ernst Wilhelm Eschmann
Karl Eschweiler
Hermann Esser
Arnold Eucken
Richard Euringer
Hanns Heinz Ewers
Olve Eggen

Notes

References

Bibliography
Klee, Ernst: Das Personenlexikon zum Dritten Reich. Wer war was vor und nach 1945. Fischer Taschenbuch Verlag, Zweite aktualisierte Auflage, Frankfurt am Main 2005 
Klee, Ernst Das Kulturlexikon zum Dritten Reich. Wer war was vor und nach 1945. S. Fischer, Frankfurt am Main 2007 
Snyder, Louis Leo, Encyclopedia of the Third Reich'', Ware: Wordsworth Editions, 1998 (originally published New York City: McGraw-Hill, 1976)

External links
A-Z category of Nazi Party members on German Wikipedia

 
Nazis